CGram Software is a Swansea-based software authoring company established in 1982. It provides accounting software, enterprise resource planning (ERP), CRM, production control and supply chain management software for small to medium-sized companies, and has a long history in the UNIX and Linux commercial world.

History
CGram Software was founded by Emrys Jones and Terry Crook in 1982. They started developing a Unix manufacturing system. Jones was at that time being actively involved with UKUUG (the UK's Unix & Open Systems User Group), becoming temporary chairman in 1982 and was Chairman of the European Unix User Group until 1985.

CGram Software started shipping the first Unix Manufacturing system in 1984 written in 'C', being sold on Plexus and Arete machines. These were Motorola MC68000 based machines. The problem with the MC68000 was that every manufacturer had its own system of memory addressing, which made portability a challenge for software add-on vendors. To solve this, CGram introduced their '68000Fix' product, which processed the relocation information in a program and converted the program to work on the required target. This allowed CGram to offer their manufacturing system on a variety of other MC68000 systems, such as Fortune & Sperry.

This system implemented a just-in-time business model with Supplier Chain management for synchronous supply in 1987. The implementation at Ikeda Hoover was the subject of a case study into manufacturing for synchronous supply in 2002. It was later extended with a full Kanban system for final assembly in 1990.

In 1998, the company discontinued its original manufacturing system, developing a new ERP system with a desktop client written in Java and Swing communicating over the internet with server-side software written in C.

Recognition
 Winner of Best Linux Business Provider Solution 2005 - UK Linux & Open Source Awards (Formerly Linux User and Developer Awards) 
 Runner up Best Mid Range Software Package, Accountancy Age Awards 2005.
 Shortlisted for Best Business Software Supplier 2005 - Computing

See also
Accounting software
List of ERP software packages
Comparison of CRM systems
Material Requirements Planning
Supply Chain Management

References

External links
Official Website
ID Card Software
FM WhatsApp APK
Yo WhatsApp APK

Business software companies
ERP software companies
Software companies of Wales
Software companies of the United Kingdom
Customer relationship management software companies
Financial software companies
Supply chain software companies
Companies based in Swansea
Enterprise resource planning software for Linux
Customer relationship management software
Software companies established in 1982
1982 establishments in Wales
Linux companies
Welsh brands